The White Sulphur Springs Open was a PGA Tour event that was played on the Old White Course of the Greenbrier Hotel in White Sulphur Springs, West Virginia during the 1920s and 1930s. The hotel is now a 721-room resort called The Greenbrier. The Old White Course opened in 1914 and is named after the Old White Hotel, which stood on the grounds from 1858 to 1922.

Winners

1938 Sam Snead
1922 Walter Hagen
1921 Jock Hutchison

See also
Greenbrier Classic, a PGA Tour event that debuted at The Greenbrier in 2010

References

Former PGA Tour events
Golf in West Virginia
The Greenbrier
1921 establishments in West Virginia
1938 disestablishments in West Virginia